Pedal to the Metal is the second album by glam metal and metalcore band Blessed by a Broken Heart and was released on August 18, 2008 in Europe and September 2, 2008 in the US through Century Media. By the time of its release, original rhythm guitarist Robbie Hart and additional guitarist/keyboardist Simon Foxx had been kicked out of the band.

Production for the album began in April 2007 and finished a month later in May.

Track listing

Personnel
 Tony Gambino – lead vocals
 Sean "Shred" Maier – lead guitar
 Robbie Hart – rhythm guitar, backing vocals
 Tyler Hoare – bass, backing vocals
 Simon Foxx – keyboard, additional guitar
 Frank "Da Bird" Shooflar – drums

References

Blessed by a Broken Heart albums
2008 albums